Oak Square is a former station on the Green Line A branch.  It was closed in 1969 when service on the branch was replaced with buses.

References

Railway stations in Boston
Green Line (MBTA) stations
Former MBTA stations in Massachusetts
Railway stations closed in 1969